Experiential education is a philosophy of education that describes the process that occurs between a teacher and student that infuses direct experience with the learning environment and content. The term is not interchangeable with experiential learning; however experiential learning is a sub-field and operates under the methodologies of experiential education. The Association for Experiential Education regards experiential education as "a philosophy that informs many methodologies in which educators purposefully engage with learners in direct experience and focused reflection in order to increase knowledge, develop skills, clarify values, and develop people's capacity to contribute to their communities". Experiential education is the term for the philosophy and educational progressivism is the movement which it informed. The Journal of Experiential Education publishes peer-reviewed empirical and theoretical academic research within the field.

About
John Dewey was the most famous proponent of hands-on learning or experiential education, which was discussed in his book Experience and Education (1938).  It expressed his ideas about curriculum theory in the context of historical debates about school organization and the need to have experience as central in the educational process; hence, experiential education is referred to as a philosophy. Dewey's fame during that period rested on relentlessly critiquing public education and pointing out that the authoritarian, strict, pre-ordained knowledge approach of modern traditional education was too concerned with delivering knowledge, and not enough with understanding students' experiences.

Dewey's work influenced dozens of other prominent experiential models and advocates in the later 20th century, including Foxfire, service learning, Kurt Hahn and Outward Bound, and Paulo Freire. Freire is often cited in works on experiential education. He focused on the participation by students in experience and radical democracy, and the creation of praxis among learners.

John Dewey was an educator, but he was foremost a philosopher. His interests included political philosophy, metaphysics, epistemology, aesthetics, logic, and philosophy of education.  Political philosophy was one of his many philosophical interests.  He saw weaknesses in both the traditional and progressive styles of education. He explains in length his criticisms of both forms of education in his book, Experience & Education (1938). In essence, he did not believe that they met the goals of education, which he defined as obtaining freedom of thought.

Dewey advocated that education be based upon the quality of experience. For an experience to be educational, Dewey believed that certain parameters had to be met, the most important of which is that the experience has continuity and interaction. Continuity is the idea that the experience comes from and leads to other experiences, in essence propelling the person to learn more. Interaction is when the experience meets the internal needs or goals of a person. Dewey also categorizes experiences as possibly being mis-educative and non-educative. A mis-educative experience is one that stops or distorts growth for future experiences. A non-educative experience is one in which a person has not done any reflection and so has obtained nothing for mental growth that is lasting (Experience & Education, Dewey).

In addition to the notions raised by Dewey, recent research has shown that experiential learning does not replace traditional methods of learning but supplements it in the form of laboratory and clinical learning to offer additional skills, perspectives, and understanding of relationships. Instead, experiential learning is designed to improve one's understanding by giving one the freedom to explore and find the learning path that is most suitable for them.

Practice

The methodologies reflected in experiential education have evolved since the time of Hahn and Dewey. For experiential education to become efficient pedagogy, physical experience must be combined with reflection. Adding reflective practice, allows for personal introspection of challenges and key learnings. That is, physical challenges provide a gateway in which we can observe qualities about ourselves, and those whom we are working with. Further, for the efficacy of experiential education, experiences must be separated, giving the learner sufficient time to process the information.

Experiential education informs many educational practices underway in schools (formal education) and out-of-school (informal education) programs.  Many teaching methods rely on experiential education to provide context and frameworks for learning through action and reflection while others at higher levels (university and professional education) focus on field skills and modeling. Examples of specific methods are outlined below.

Outdoor education uses organized learning activities that occur in the outdoors, and uses environmental experiences as a learning tool.
Service learning is a combination of community service with stated learning goals, relying on experience as the foundation for meaning.
Cooperative learning alters homogeneous groupings in order to support diverse learning styles and needs within a group.
Active learning, a term popular in US education circles in the 1980s, encourages learners to take responsibility for their learning, requiring their experience in education to inform their process of learning.
Environmental education is based in educating learners about relationships within the natural environment and how those relationships are interdependent. Students participate in outdoor activities as part of their learning experience.
Vocational education involves training for an occupation.
Sandwich degrees involve a year working in industry during academic study.

Experiential education serves as an umbrella for linking many diverse practices into a coherent whole.  For example, it is often the basis of the initiatives to link traditional scholarly priorities (e.g. formal knowledge production) with improvement of professional practice. Its philosophy is closely linked to numerous other educational theories, but it should not be conflated with progressive education, critical pedagogy, youth empowerment, feminist-based education, and constructivism. The development of experiential education as a philosophy has been intertwined with the development of these other educational theories; their contrasts have clarified differences.

Fellowships and other training programs are available for experiential educators; but, formal training in experiential methods is lacking for K-12 undergraduate teaching programs (see Wendel, A. and Mantil, A., (2008) and the National Society for Experiential Education). The growth of experiential education is also partly attributed to advances in technology, which provide useful tools for experiential training.

Examples 
Examples of experiential education can be found in various disciplines. The educator Lucy Calkins writes,

Writing journals proves to be quite effective as part of English classes. Specifically, by writing "personal" and "text-related" journals, students find meaning in their own thoughts as well as in concepts learned in class. Personal journaling is the recording of past and present personal thoughts and events in the student's life to enhance self-awareness, student interest, and learning. Text-related journaling is writing about concepts learned in class in relation to students' personal experiences, to promote understanding.

The Nicodemus Wilderness Project provides an environmental experiential education program with a global reach called the "Apprentice Ecologist Initiative".  This scholarship-based opportunity is targeted for youth volunteers who want to help protect the environment.  The initiative seeks to develop young people for leadership roles by engaging them in environmental cleanup and conservation projects, empower volunteers to rebuild the environmental and social well-being of our communities, and improve local living conditions for both citizens and wildlife.

Presidential Classroom, a non-profit civic education organization in Washington, D.C., is open to high school students from across the country and abroad.  They meet and interact with government officials, media correspondents, congressman, and key players on the world stage to learn how public policy shapes many aspects of citizens' lives.  Students travel to Washington and spend a week hearing from prominent speakers, meet with interest group spokesmen and tour the national capital.  Students participate in a group project directed by experienced instructors; they have mediated debates on current issues facing the country.  The focus of the week is to give students a hands-on introduction to how "real world" politics take place.

Global College, a four-year international study program offered by Long Island University, is based on self-guided, experiential learning while a student is immersed in foreign cultures. Regional centers employ mostly advisors rather than teaching faculty; these advisors guide the individual students in preparing a "portfolio of learning" each semester to display the results of their experiences and projects.

The New England Literature Program in the English Department at the University of Michigan is a 45-day program, in which University instructors live and work together with 40 UM students in the woods of Maine in early spring.  They intensively study 19th and 20th-century New England literature, in a program that includes creative writing in the form of academic journaling, as well as a deep physical engagement with the landscape of New England.  NELP students and staff take hiking trips into the White Mountains and other parts of the New England natural areas each week, integrating their experience of the landscape with writing and discussion of texts.

The Chicago Center for Urban Life and Culture is the only nonprofit and independent experiential educational program for college students in the United States.  The Chicago Center is distinguished by unique seminars characterized by a 'First Voice' pedagogy, its location in the multi-ethnic Hyde Park neighborhood of Chicago, and development of several hundred internship sites in Chicago. While many of the students who attend Chicago Center grew up in cities, the majority are from suburban, rural and farming communities. Students participate individually in its Semester, May Term and Summer Session.  The Chicago Center also designs and staffs programs for groups, what it calls "LearnChicago!", which promise non-tourist experiences in the city.

The Philadelphia Center is an off-campus program based on a model of experiential education.  Recognized by The Great Lakes Colleges Association, The Philadelphia Center is currently the only undergraduate level program that supports independent living and encourages the use of the city as a learning space.

Several Australian high schools have established experiential education programmes, including Caulfield Grammar School's five-week internationalism programme in Nanjing, China and Geelong Grammar School's Timbertop outdoor education programme.

At the professional school level, experiential education is often integrated into curricula in "clinical" courses following the medical school model of "See one, Do one, Teach one", in which students learn by practicing medicine.  This approach is being introduced in other professions in which skills are directly worked into courses to teach every concept (starting with interviewing, listening skills, negotiation, contract writing and advocacy, for example) to larger-scale projects in which students run legal aid clinics or community loan programs, or write legislation or community development plans.

The Boys & Girls Clubs of America provides a framework for youth development professionals to employ experiential learning methods.

Lifeworks International offers experiential, service-learning programs for high school students. Trips combine adventure travel, cultural immersion, community service, and global education during expeditions in China, Thailand, India, Costa Rica, Peru, the British Virgin Islands, and Ecuador and the Galapagos Islands.

In Legal Education, critical pedagogy is associated with devising more equitable methods of teaching, helping students develop consciousness of freedom, and helping them connect knowledge to power.

Change in roles and structures
Whether teachers employ experiential education in cultural journalism, service learning, environmental education, or more traditional school subjects, its key idea involves engaging student voice in active roles for the purpose of learning. Armstrong (2012) claims that students should be responsible for learning, not teachers. Students participate in a real activity with real consequences for the purpose of meeting learning objectives.

Experiential education uses various tools like field work, policy and civic activity, and entrepreneurship outside of the classroom along with games, simulations, role plays, stories in classrooms. The experiential education mindset changes the way the teachers and students view knowledge. Knowledge is no longer just some letters on a page. It becomes active, something that is transacted with in life or lifelike situations. It starts to make teachers experience and skill facilitators, and not just transmitters of the written word.

Besides changing student roles, experiential education requires a change in the role of teachers. When students are active learners, their endeavors often take them outside the classroom walls. Because action precedes attempts to synthesize knowledge, teachers generally cannot plan a curriculum unit as a neat, predictable package.  Teachers become active learners, too, experimenting together with their students, reflecting upon the learning activities they have designed, and responding to their students' reactions to the activities. In this way, teachers themselves become more active; they come to view themselves as more than just recipients of school district policy and curriculum decisions.

It is also important to point out that not all learners learn in the same way. As a result, there are diverse learners that have unique learning styles pertinent to their success as students. Studies have shown that cooperative learning is strongly suggested in a diverse learning atmosphere. "Contemporary views of learning and their pedagogical applications have begun to change traditional classroom interaction patterns, shaping the communicative roles of the teacher and students as participants in a classroom learning community," write David Wray & Kristiina Kumpulainen. This paradigm shift in education gives both the student and teacher shared responsibility of the learning process. The teacher's participation in discussion sessions is to act as a facilitator, maintain classroom decorum, provide individual and group feedback, and alleviate concerns or issues in the lesson.

Critical thinking strategies are pertinent to the success of student-oriented learning. When students are engaged in active discussions, high-level thinking skills are put into practice to the point where students are synthesizing the information at a deeper level of understanding. According to Elliot Eisner, "We need to provide opportunities for youngsters and adolescents to engage in challenging kinds of conversation, and we need to help them know how to do so. Such conversation is all too rare in schools. I use 'conversation' seriously, for challenging conversation is an intellectual affair. It has to do with thinking about what people have said and responding reflectively, analytically, and imaginatively to that process. The practice of conversation is almost a lost art. The most significant intellectual achievement is not so much in problem solving, but in question posing." Through experimental education, students are capable of finding their voice through peer-to-peer interaction. Students are now seen as active participants in the learning process. Vygotsky's social development theory requires students to play untraditional roles as they collaborate with one another through critical thinking and conversational skills. According to Ann Ketch, author of Conversation: The comprehension connection writes, "The oral process helps students clarify and solidify their thoughts. The thinking changes from what it was before the conversation took place. Through conversation, the student is in charge of his or her own mental processing. The teacher acts as a facilitator, pushing the student to rely upon and monitor his or her own comprehension, which fosters critical thinking." This is very vital because student conversation can elicit new ideas that may not have been mentioned or even thought of by another student. Therefore, student dialogue is very important because it helps individuals make sense of what is being learned. It also helps build respect for other's opinions while taking ownership of his or her learning process.

In experimental education, students are given the opportunity to apply their knowledge and skills by making connections to the real world. Therefore, effective learning entails active experimentation with a hands-on approach to learning. It is perceived that students learn more by being active. Students are interdependent in establishing group goals and decision-making skills. As a result, students are also capable of developing leadership skills, which can also enhance student motivation and confidence.

When students are given a choice in terms of content to be learned, it ensures the teacher that his or her learners are interactive in the learning process. According to Ernie Stringer, "Action learners move through continuous cycles of this inquiry process to improve their understanding, extend their knowledge, or refine their skills." When given a preference, students may feel motivated to take control of his or her learning experience. Student incentives are tied to progress in academic achievement. "Research indicates that intrinsic motivation stems from one's interests and capacities to surmount challenge s when presented or pursued," says Fenice B. Boyd. Many schools are encouraging teachers to tap into student interests with the hope that they transfer that motivation into the classroom.

Through the continuous cycle of learning, teacher's often work with students to develop a framework of knowledge, which is to be evaluated based on student input to the lessons content. Therefore, the teacher should establish criteria of what is to be learned as related to the student(s) choice in learning material. Ernie Stringer draws on the importance that "action research provides a process for developing a rich, engaging curriculum relevant to the lives and purposes of students, engaging their interests and abilities, and serving the broad human needs of community, society, and the planet. Creative construction of curricula or syllabi provides the means whereby the needs, perspectives, and/or interests of diverse stakeholders can be incorporated into vital, creative, effective programs of learning." In essence, a well-planned curriculum is designed for learning that encompasses a broad range of goals and individual needs that ensures the active learning process.

As students and teachers take on new roles, the traditional organizational structures of the school also may meet challenges. For example, at the Challenger Middle School in Colorado Springs, Colorado, service activities are an integral part of the academic program. Such nontraditional activities require teachers and administrators to look at traditional practices in new ways. For instance, they may consider reorganizing time blocks. They may also teach research methods by involving students in investigations of the community, rather than restricting research activities to the library (Rolzinski, 1990). 

At the University Heights Alternative School in the Bronx, the Project Adventure experiential learning program has led the faculty to adopt an all-day time block as an alternative to the traditional 45-minute periods. The faculty now organizes the curriculum by project instead of by separate disciplines. Schools that promote meaningful student involvement actively engage students as partners in education improvement activities. These young people learn while planning, researching, teaching, and making decisions that affect the entire education system.

Other university level programs are entirely field-taught on outdoor expeditions. These courses combine traditional academic readings and written assignments with field observations, service projects, open discussions of course material, and meetings with local speakers who are involved with the course subjects. These "hybrid" experiential/traditional programs aim to provide the academic rigor of a classroom course with the breadth and personal connections of experiential education.

Transitions from traditional to experiential

At first, these new roles and structures may seem unfamiliar and uncomfortable to both students and adults in the school. Traditionally, students have most often been rewarded for competing rather than cooperating with one another. Teachers are not often called upon for collaborative work either. Teaching has traditionally been an activity carried out in isolation from one's peers, behind closed doors. Principals, accustomed to the traditional hierarchical structure of schools, often do not know how to help their teachers constitute self-managed work teams or how to help teachers coach students to work in cooperative teams. The techniques of experiential education can help students and staff adjust to teamwork, an important part of the process of reforming schools.

Adventure education may use the philosophy of experiential education in developing team and group skills in both students and adults (Rohnke, 1989). Initially, groups work to solve problems that are unrelated to the problems in their actual school environment. For example, in a ropes course designed to build the skills required by teamwork, a faculty or student team might work together to get the entire group over a 12-foot wall or through an intricate web of rope. After each challenge in a series of this kind, the group looks at how it functioned as a team:

 Who took the leadership roles?
 Did the planning process help or hinder progress?
 Did people listen to one another in the group and use the strengths of all group members?
 Did everyone feel that the group was a supportive environment in which they felt comfortable making a contribution and taking risks?

The wall or web of rope can then become a metaphor for the classroom or school environment. While the problems and challenges of the classroom or school are different from the physical challenges of the adventure activity, many skills needed to respond successfully as a team are the same in both settings.

These skills – listening, recognizing each other's strengths, and supporting each other through difficulties – can apply equally well to an academic Socratic Method of questioning or problem-solving toward schoolwide improvement efforts.

For example, the Kane School in Lawrence, Massachusetts has been using adventure as a tool for school restructuring. The entire faculty – particularly the Faculty Advisory Council, which shares the decisionmaking responsibilities with the principal – has honed group skills through experiential education activities developed by Project Adventure. These skills include open communication, methods of conflict resolution, and mechanisms for decision making (High Strides, 1990).

Development in Asian countries

Established in 1973, Breakthrough in Hong Kong was the first non-profit organization that applied the concepts of experiential education (though primarily conceptualized in terms of outdoor adventure education) in youth works. Since then, development in experiential education has proceeded in Singapore, Taiwan, Macau, and some large cities in China.

Experiential methods in education have existed in China for thousands of years.  However, John Dewey was in China in the early 1900s and his ideas were extremely popular.  Interest in Dewey's experience in China and contribution is growing.

Experiential education started in Qatar in 2010 through AL-Bairaq, which is an outreach, non-traditional educational program that targets high school students and focuses on a curriculum based on STEM fields. The idea behind AL-Bairaq is to offer high school students the opportunity to connect with the research environment in the Center for Advanced Materials (CAM) at Qatar University. Faculty members train and mentor the students and help develop and enhance their critical thinking, problem-solving, and teamwork skills, using a hands-on-activities approach.

Starting in the twenty-teens, experiential education organizations in Asia begin gaining accreditation by the Association for Experiential Education, which had historically primarily served a North American audience. Outward Bound Hong Kong was accredited in 2011, followed by Chadwick International in Korea in 2019 and the Hanifl Centre in 2020.

Methods

There are multiple ways in which experiential education is practiced.  Examples of experiential learning methods used include:

Active-based learning – All participants in the group must engage actively in working together toward the stated objectives.
Place-based learning – The process of using local community and environment as a starting point to teach concepts in language arts, mathematics, social studies, science, and other subjects across the curriculum.
Problem-based learning – Provides a structure for discovery that helps students internalize learning and leads to greater comprehension.
Project-based learning – An instructional method that uses projects as the central focus of instruction in a variety of disciplines.
Service-learning – Providing meaningful service to a community agency or organization while simultaneously gaining new skills, knowledge and understanding as an integrated aspect of an academic program.
Simulation-based learning – A combination of active, problem, project, and place-based learning; Participants are placed in a simulated environment and given objectives requiring constant attention and care.

All of these use the pattern of problem, plan, test and reflect as their foundation for the educative experience.

See also

References

Boyd, F.B. (2002). Motivation to continue: Enhancing literacy learning for struggling readers and writers. Reading and Writing Quarterly. (18) 3, 257–277. Calkins, L. (1991). Living between the lines. Portsmouth, NH: Heinemann Educational Books, Inc.
Carroll, Mary. "Divine Therapy: Teaching Reflective and Meditative Practices." Teaching Theology and Religion 8.Oct 2005 232–238. 27 Jun 2008.
Dewey, J. (1938). Experience and Education. New York: Collier Books.
Educational Writers Association. (1990). Lawrence grows its own leaders. High Strides: Bimonthly Report on Urban Middle Grades, 2 (12). Washington, D.C.: Author.
Eisner, E.W. (2001). What does it mean to say a school is doing well? Phi Delta Kappan, 81(5).
Fletcher, A. (2005). Meaningful student involvement: Students as partners in school change. Olympia, WA: HumanLinks Foundation.
Freire, P. (1971). Pedagogy of the Oppressed. NY: Continuum.
Goodlad, J. (1984). A place called school: Prospects for the future. NY: McGraw Hill.
Hampton, Scott E. "Reflective Journaling and Assessment." Journal of Professional Issues in Engineering Education & Practice 129.Oct 2003 186–189. 27 Jun 2008
Kelly, Melissa. "Journals in the Classroom." About.com: Secondary Education 27 Jun 2008

Kielsmeier, J., & Willits, R. (1989). Growing hope: A sourcebook on integrating youth service into the curriculum. St. Paul, MN: National Youth Leadership Council, University of Minnesota.
Knoll, Michael (2011) School Reform Through „Experiential Therapy": Kurt Hahn – An Efficacious Educator. Eric-online document 515256
Kraft, D., & Sakofs, M. (Eds.). (1988). The theory of experiential education. Boulder, CO: Association for Experiential Education.
Kremenitizer, Janet Pickard. "The Emotionally Intelligent Early Childhood Educator: Self-Reflective Journaling." Early Childhood Education Journal 33.August 2005 3–9. 27 Jun 2008
Kumpulainen, K.; Wray, D. (2002). Classroom interaction and social learning: From theory to practice.  New York, NY: Routledge-Falmer.
Nelson, G.Lynn. Writing and Being Embracing your Life through Creative Journaling. Revised and Updated. Maui, Hawaii: Inner Ocean Publishing, Inc, 2004.
Rohnke, K. (1989). Cowstails and cobras II. Dubuque, IA: Kendall/Hunt Publishing Company.
Rolzinski, C. (1990). The adventure of adolescence: Middle school students and community service. Washington, D.C.: Youth Service America.
Sizer, T. (1984). Horace's compromise. Boston: Houghton Mifflin Company.
Stringer, E. (2008). Action research in education. Upper Saddle River, New Jersey: Pearson Education Inc.
Stringer, E., Christensen, L.M., & Baldwin, S.C. (2009). Integrating teaching, learning, and action research: Enhancing instruction in k–12 classrooms. Thousand Oaks, CA: Sage Publications Inc.
Wigginton, E. (1985). Sometimes a shining moment: The Foxfire experience. Garden City, NY: Anchor Press/Doubleday.

External links

 Changing Schools through Experiential Education. ERIC Digest. The original version of this Wikipedia article is based on the public domain text at this site.
 School Reform Through „Experiential Therapy"

Applied learning
Alternative education
Philosophy of education
 
Outdoor education
Critical pedagogy